Spanish Masters (released as Sounds of Spain / Concerto d'Aranjuez in France) is the seventh album released by the Paris-based Swingle Singers.  All tracks from this album are also included on the 11 disk Philips boxed set, Swingle Singers.

Track listing
Side 'A':
"Romanza Andaluza," for violin & piano, Op. 22/1 (Pablo de Sarasate) – 2:50
"Concierto de Aranjuez," for guitar & orchestra: Adagio (Joaquín Rodrigo) – 4:22
"Spanish Dances" (12), in 4 volumes for piano, Op. 37, H. 142, DLR 1:2: 6. Rondalla Aragonesa in D major (Enrique Granados) – 2:33
"España," album leaves (6) for piano, Op. 165, B. 37: 2. Tango in D major (Isaac Albéniz) – 2:15
"Suite española No. 1, for piano, Op. 47, B. 7: 1. Granada" (Albéniz) – 2:49
Side 'B':
"Suite española No. 1, for piano, Op. 47, B. 7: 3. Sevilla" (Albéniz) – 3:44
"Jeux Interdits" ("Spanish Romance" / "Romance Espagnole"), for guitar (Anonymous) – 2:38
"Spanish Dances" (2) (Morceaux charactéristiques), for piano, Op. 164, B. 36: Tango in A minor (Albéniz) – 3:25
"Keyboard Sonata No. 84 in D major" (Allegro) (Antonio Soler) – 3:02
"Spanish Dances" (12), in 4 volumes for piano, Op. 37, H. 142, DLR 1:2: 5. Andaluza in E minor (Granados) – 2:18

Personnel
Vocals:
Jeanette Baucomont – soprano
Christiane Legrand – soprano
Hélène Devos – alto
Claudine Meunier – alto
Ward Swingle – tenor, arranger
Joseph Noves – tenor
Jean Cussac – bass
José Germain – bass
Rhythm section:
Guy Pedersen – double bass
Daniel Humair – drums

References / external links

Philips PHM 200-261
Sounds of Spain at [ Allmusic.com]

The Swingle Singers albums
1967 albums
French-language albums